Diane Lynn Dixon (born September 23, 1964) is an American athlete who competed mainly in the 400 metres. She was born in Brooklyn, New York.  She has an Olympic gold medal for running with the American 4x400 meters relay team at the 1984 Olympics, running in the preliminary rounds.

She competed for the United States in the 1988 Summer Olympics held in Seoul, South Korea in the 4 x 400 metres where she won the Silver medal with her teammates Denean Howard, Valerie Brisco-Hooks and Florence Griffith Joyner. Second place in that race is still the second fastest time ever run in that event behind the winning Soviet team and the current American record.  She set her personal record of 49.84 while finishing third in an open semi-final in Seoul. Four years earlier she ran in the qualifying heat for the same relay that eventually took gold.

Dixon was also a part of two medal-winning teams in the 4x400 relay at the IAAF World Championships, taking a bronze in 1987 in Rome and a silver in 1991 in Tokyo.

Dixon was known for her aggressive frontrunning style indoors, where she could take the lead at the break (after the first 50 meters) and hold off her competitors who would then be forced to try to run around her. In 1981 she won her first of her USA Indoor Track and Field Championships at the (then) Imperial distance of 440 yards. In 1983 she won again and began an unprecedented streak of ten consecutive wins in the 440 or 400 metres.
  In 1985, Dixon won the 400 metres at the IAAF World Indoor Championships.  She repeated the feat again in 1991, setting the American Record at 50.64 seconds in the event.  That record stood until March 13, 2010, when it was broken by Francena McCorory from Hampton University at the NCAA Championships.

Diane Dixon attended the Brooklyn Technical High School and graduated in 1982.

Diane Dixon owns the distinction of being the first Ohio State women's student-athlete to capture an individual national track                                                        championship in the 400 meters at the 1983 indoor championships.

After retiring, Diane worked to help other athletes with career guidance by founding Retired Elite Athletes Need Career Opportunities.

References

External links
 
 
 Brooklyn Technical High School Alumni Foundation

1964 births
Living people
Sportspeople from Brooklyn
Track and field athletes from New York City
American female sprinters
Athletes (track and field) at the 1984 Summer Olympics
Athletes (track and field) at the 1988 Summer Olympics
Ohio State Buckeyes women's track and field athletes
Olympic silver medalists for the United States in track and field
World Athletics Championships medalists
World Athletics Championships athletes for the United States
Medalists at the 1988 Summer Olympics
Medalists at the 1984 Summer Olympics
Athletes (track and field) at the 1987 Pan American Games
Pan American Games gold medalists for the United States
Olympic gold medalists for the United States in track and field
Pan American Games medalists in athletics (track and field)
Goodwill Games medalists in athletics
World Athletics Indoor Championships winners
World Athletics Indoor Championships medalists
Competitors at the 1986 Goodwill Games
Medalists at the 1987 Pan American Games
Olympic female sprinters
20th-century American women
21st-century American women